Hamdi Laachir is a Moroccan professional footballer who plays as a winger.

Honours

Club
RS Berkane
CAF Confederation Cup: 2019–20; runner-up: 2018–19
Moroccan Throne Cup: 2018
 CAF Super Cup: runner-up: 2021

References

1987 births
Living people
Moroccan footballers
Footballers from Casablanca
Association Salé players
RS Berkane players
Association football wingers